Slivnitsa is a town in western Bulgaria, 22 km away from Sofia, lying on the main road connecting the capital with the Bulgarian-Serbian border. Slivnitsa is part of Sofia Province and is close to the towns of Kostinbrod and Dragoman.

Called by historians the "battle of the captains vs the generals," referring to the young Bulgarian army, whose highest rank went up to a captain, the Battle of Slivnitsa was a decisive factor in the victory of the Bulgarian Army over the Serbs between 17 and 19 November 1885. It solidified the unification between the Kingdom of Bulgaria and Eastern Rumelia.

A small mountain named Viskyar stands out to the south and the southwest of Slivnitsa. The mountain's highest peak is called Mechi Kamak (Мечи камък, "Bear's Stone") and is 1,077 m high. Viskyar is rich in archeological and historical remains. Important strategic and commercial roads, connecting the southern end of the Balkan peninsula with the Danube River and Western Europe, have passed through these lands since Antiquity. An interesting sight is the memorial church, built to the southeast of the Gurgulyat village.

Municipality
Slivnitsa is the seat of Slivnitsa municipality (part of Sofia Province), which also includes the following 12 villages:

External links
 Directorate "Labour Office" - Slivnitsa

Slivnitsa's Community Website (in Bulgarian-Cyrillic) including the Football Team, 
Slivnishki Geroii (Сливнишки герой )  Сливнишки герой

Gallery 

Towns in Bulgaria
Populated places in Sofia Province